Thomas Woodcock may refer to:

Sir Thomas Woodcock (born 1951), Garter Principal King of Arms
Thomas Woodcock (VC) (1888–1918), English soldier, recipient of the Victoria Cross

 Thomas Woodcock, the last prior of Beauvale Charterhouse
Tommy Woodcock (1905–1985), Australian jockey and horse trainer